is a Japanese politician of the New Komeito Party, a member of the House of Representatives in the Diet (national legislature). A native of Gifu, Gifu and graduate of Keio University, he joined the Ministry of Foreign Affairs in 1969, attending the University of Cambridge while in the ministry. Leaving the ministry in 1988, he was elected for the first time in 1990.

References

External links 
  in Japanese.

Members of the House of Representatives (Japan)
Living people
1947 births
People from Gifu
New Komeito politicians
21st-century Japanese politicians